Eduardo Vargas (born 26 February 1910, date of death unknown) was an Argentine boxer. He competed in the men's lightweight event at the 1932 Summer Olympics.

References

External links
 

1910 births
Year of death missing
Argentine male boxers
Olympic boxers of Argentina
Boxers at the 1932 Summer Olympics
People from Puerto Madryn
Lightweight boxers